Jenna Gozali (born 24 March 1990) is a former Indonesian badminton player from the PB Djarum club. Gozali now bearing the United States flag in the international tournament as a Bay Badminton Center player.

Achievements

BWF Grand Prix (1 runner-up) 
The BWF Grand Prix had two levels, the Grand Prix and Grand Prix Gold. It was a series of badminton tournaments sanctioned by the Badminton World Federation (BWF) and played between 2007 and 2017.

Women's doubles

  BWF Grand Prix Gold tournament
  BWF Grand Prix tournament

BWF International Challenge/Series (2 titles, 3 runners-up) 
Women's doubles

Mixed doubles

  BWF International Challenge tournament
  BWF International Series tournament
  BWF Future Series tournament

BWF Junior International (1 title, 1 runner-up) 
Mixed doubles

  BWF Junior International Grand Prix tournament
  BWF Junior International Challenge tournament
  BWF Junior International Series tournament
  BWF Junior Future Series tournament

References

External links 
 
 

1990 births
Living people
Indonesian people of Chinese descent
Sportspeople from Surabaya
Indonesian female badminton players
American female badminton players
Universiade medalists in badminton
Universiade gold medalists for Indonesia
Medalists at the 2011 Summer Universiade
People from South San Francisco, California
21st-century American women